United Energy Pakistan (UEP), formerly known as BP Pakistan,  is a subsidiary of Chinese United Energy Group in Pakistan with a footprint in Sindh province of Pakistan, around 100 km to the east of Karachi. United Energy Group had acquired the Pakistani assets from BP in September 2011 and BP Pakistan thus became UEP.

The company's asset cover Badin, Tando Muhammad Khan, Tando Allahyar, Thatta, Hyderabad (rural), Matiari, Sanghar, Mirpur Khas and khairpur of the Sindh province. Currently, there are active production and exploration blocks in Sindh province and four offshore exploration blocks in the Arabian Sea. The company also won bids for two new exploration blocks, Digri and Sanghar South, which lie adjacent to UEP's Mirpur Khas Khipro concession areas.

History
In 2012, UEP secured a credit line of $5 billion from China Development Bank for its Pakistani operations and other potential acquisitions.

In FY2019, United Energy Pakistan was the largest foreign oil and gas exploration and production company in Pakistan, and remained 9th on the list with exports worth $227 million.

References

Oil and gas companies of Pakistan
2011 mergers and acquisitions
Pakistani subsidiaries of foreign companies
Privately held companies of Pakistan